The Academy Award for Best Film Editing is one of the annual awards of the Academy of Motion Picture Arts and Sciences (AMPAS). Nominations for this award are closely correlated with the Academy Award for Best Picture. For 33 consecutive years, 1981 to 2013, every Best Picture winner had also been nominated for the Film Editing Oscar, and about two thirds of the Best Picture winners have also won for Film Editing. Only the principal, "above the line" editor(s) as listed in the film's credits are named on the award; additional editors, supervising editors, etc. are not currently eligible.

The nominations for this Academy Award are determined by a ballot of the voting members of the Editing Branch of the Academy; there were 220 members of the Editing Branch in 2012. The members may vote for up to five of the eligible films in the order of their preference; the five films with the largest vote totals are selected as nominees. The Academy Award itself is selected from the nominated films by a subsequent ballot of all active and life members of the Academy. This process is essentially the reverse of that of the British Academy of Film and Television Arts (BAFTA); nominations for the BAFTA Award for Best Editing are done by a general ballot of Academy voters, and the winner is selected by members of the editing chapter.

History
This award was first given for films released in 1934. The name of this award is occasionally changed; in 2008, it was listed as the Academy Award for Achievement in Film Editing.

Four film editors have won this award three times in their career:

 Ralph Dawson won for A Midsummer Night's Dream (1935), Anthony Adverse (1936), and The Adventures of Robin Hood (1938)
 Daniel Mandell won for The Pride of the Yankees (1942), The Best Years of Our Lives (1946), and The Apartment (1960).
 Michael Kahn won for Raiders of the Lost Ark (1981), Schindler's List (1993), and Saving Private Ryan (1998).
 Thelma Schoonmaker won for Raging Bull (1980), The Aviator (2004), and The Departed (2006).

To date, two film directors have won this award, James Cameron and Alfonso Cuarón for the films Titanic and Gravity, respectively. Directors David Lean, Steve James, Joel Coen and Ethan Coen (under the alias "Roderick Jaynes"), Michel Hazanavicius, Jean-Marc Vallée (under the alias "John Mac McMurphy") and Chloé Zhao have been nominated for editing their own films, with Cameron, Cuarón, and the Coens each being nominated for the award twice. Additionally, Best Film Editing winner, Walter Murch, although known for film editing and sound, directed the Oscar nominated Return to Oz and is, to date, the only person with Oscars for both sound engineering and film editing, winning them in the same year for his work on The English Patient. Also, nominated editors Robert Wise, Francis D. Lyon, winner for Body and Soul and Hal Ashby, winner for In the Heat of the Night, became directors whose films were in turn nominated for Best Film Editing, namely Somebody Up There Likes Me, I Want to Live!, West Side Story, The Sound of Music, The Sand Pebbles and The Andromeda Strain for Wise, Crazylegs for Lyon and Bound for Glory and Coming Home for Ashby.

Superlatives

Superlatives taken from a document published by the Academy of Motion Picture Arts and Sciences.

Winners and nominees
These listings are based on the Awards Database maintained by the Academy of Motion Picture Arts and Sciences.

1930s

1940s

1950s

1960s

1970s

1980s

1990s

2000s

2010s

2020s

Multiple nominations
The following editors have received multiple nominations for the Academy Award for Best Film Editing. This list is sorted by the number of total awards won (with the number of total nominations listed in parentheses).

3: Michael Kahn (8)
3: Thelma Schoonmaker (8)
3: Daniel Mandell (5)
3: Ralph Dawson (4)
2: William H. Reynolds (7)
2: Harold F. Kress (6)
2: William A. Lyon (6)
2: Joe Hutshing (4)
2: Pietro Scalia (4)
2: Kirk Baxter (3)
2: Gene Milford (3)
2: Conrad A. Nervig (3)
2: Arthur Schmidt (3)
2: Angus Wall (3)
2: Harry W. Gerstad (2)
2: Paul Weatherwax (2)
1: Barbara McLean (7)
1: Walter Murch (6)
1: Anne V. Coates (5)
1: William Goldenberg (5)
1: Fredric Steinkamp (5)
1: Ralph E. Winters (5)
1: Anne Bauchens (4)
1: Daniel P. Hanley (4)
1: Mike Hill (4)
1: William Hornbeck (4)
1: Frank P. Keller (4)
1: James E. Newcom (4)
1: George Amy (3)
1: John Bloom (3)

1: Joel Cox (3)
1: Lisa Fruchtman (3)
1: Gerald B. Greenberg (3)
1: Gene Havlick (3)
1: Hal C. Kern (3)
1: Stephen Mirrione (3)
1: Charles Nelson (3)
1: Christopher Rouse (3)
1: Lee Smith (3)
1: Joe Walker (3)
1: Peter Zinner (3)
1: Hal Ashby (2)
1: Conrad Buff (2)
1: James Cameron (2)
1: Richard Chew (2)
1: Jim Clark (2)
1: Tom Cross (2)
1: Alfonso Cuarón (2)
1: Adrienne Fazan (2)
1: Verna Fields (2)
1: John Gilbert (2)
1: Richard A. Harris (2)
1: Alan Heim (2)
1: Paul Hirsch (2)
1: Robert J. Kern (2)
1: Marcia Lucas (2)
1: Michael McCusker (2)
1: Mikkel E. G. Nielsen (2)
1: Thom Noble (2)
1: Robert Parrish (2)
1: Gene Ruggiero (2)

1: Claire Simpson (2)
1: Cotton Warburton (2)
1: Elmo Williams (2)
0: Gerry Hambling (6)
0: Frederic Knudtson (6)
0: Al Clark (5)
0: Warren Low (4)
0: Michael Luciano (4)
0: Richard Marks (4)
0: Dorothy Spencer (4)
0: Dede Allen (3)
0: Philip W. Anderson (3)
0: Jay Cassidy (3)
0: Hank Corwin (3)
0: Richard Francis-Bruce (3)
0: Stuart Gilmore (3)
0: Doane Harrison (3)
0: Pembroke J. Herring (3)
0: Robert C. Jones (3)
0: Ralph Kemplen (3)
0: Sam O'Steen (3)
0: Steven Rosenblum (3)
0: William Steinkamp (3)
0: Frank J. Urioste (3)
0: Ferris Webster (3)
0: Robert L. Wolfe (3)
0: William H. Ziegler (3)
0: Tariq Anwar (2)
0: Stuart Baird (2)
0: Alan Baumgarten (2)

0: Samuel E. Beetley (2)
0: Danford B. Greene (2)
0: Walter Hannemann (2)
0: Roderick Jaynes (2)
0: Sheldon Kahn (2)
0: Saar Klein (2)
0: Viola Lawrence (2)
0: Chris Lebenzon (2)
0: Louis R. Loeffler (2)
0: Barry Malkin (2)
0: Owen Marks (2)
0: Pamela Martin (2)
0: Craig McKay (2)
0: Sally Menke (2)
0: Otto Meyer (2)
0: Frank Morriss (2)
0: Eve Newman (2)
0: Paul Rubell (2)
0: Arthur P. Schmidt (2)
0: Bud S. Smith (2)
0: Tim Squyres (2)
0: Crispin Struthers (2)
0: Robert Swink (2)
0: Walter A. Thompson (2)
0: Dylan Tichenor (2)
0: Sherman Todd (2)
0: Dennis Virkler (2)
0: Billy Weber (2)
0: Andrew Weisblum (2)
0: John Wright (2)

See also
 BAFTA Award for Best Editing
 Academy Award for Best Sound Editing
 Independent Spirit Award for Best Editing
 Critics' Choice Movie Award for Best Editing
 American Cinema Editors Award for Best Edited Feature Film – Dramatic
 American Cinema Editors Award for Best Edited Feature Film – Comedy or Musical

References

Film Editing
Film editing awards